Pandit Deendayal Energy University (PDEU), formerly Pandit Deendayal Petroleum University (PDPU), has been established by GERMI as a Private University through the State Act enacted on 4 April 2007. The university is located at Raysan village of Gandhinagar city in an area known as Knowledge Corridor, and it is near the GIFT City. It is 8 km from Gujarat state capital Gandhinagar, and 23 km from Gujarat's largest city Ahmedabad.

Pandit Deendayal Energy University has been awarded Scientific & Industrial Research Organization (SIRO) recognition by Department of Scientific and Industrial Research, Ministry of Science & Technology, Government of India.

PDEU has been ranked as no. 1 Private University in Gujarat and has received "Centre of Excellence Status" (in Principle) by Government of Gujarat. 

The university has four schools, located on the same campus. The schools include the School of Energy Technology (SoET)(formerly, School of Petroleum Technology(SPT)), the School of Technology (SoT), the School of Management (SoM) (formerly, School of Petroleum Management), and the School of Liberal Studies (SLS). The President of University Board of Governors is Dr. Mukesh Ambani and the Chairman of the Standing Committee is Dr. HAsmukh Adhia.

The university also has its own one megawatt solar power plant.  The Government of Gujarat has decided to set up an international Centre of Excellence in Automobile at PDPU with investment of Rs. 150 Crores (US$ 25M) in joint venture with Maruti Suzuki.

History
Pandit Deendayal Energy University (PDEU) has been formed on Gujarat energy Research and Management Institute (GERMI) as a Private University through the State Act enacted on 4 April 2007.

The University is recognized by UGC (University Grants Commission)  and is a member of AIU (Association of Indian Universities). The university has been accredited with Grade A++ by the National Assessment and Accreditation Council In October 2022, Minister of Human Resource Development, Prakash Javadekar announced that the University Grants Commission (India) has granted autonomy to PDPU, making it one of only two private universities in India accorded this autonomy. PDEU is the first college in Gujarat that has been granted autonomy. Henceforth university will have the freedom to start new courses, off-campus centers, skill development courses, research parks, and any other new academic programs. It will also give it the freedom to hire foreign faculty, enroll foreign students, give incentive-based emoluments to the faculty, enter into academic collaborations and run open distance learning programs.

Schools
The 4 schools of PDEU offer both niche programs as well as programs of general interest, covering UG, PG and Doctoral programs in Management, Humanities, Science and Engineering:

 School of Petroleum Management (Established, 2006) offers MBA and Executive MBA programs with specializations in Energy and Infrastructure, General Management (Operations, Marketing, HR, and Finance). 
 School of Petroleum Technology (Established, 2007) offers B.Tech, M.Tech, and Ph.D. programs in upstream & downstream Petroleum Engineering.
 School of Technology (Established, 2010) offers B.Tech. Engineering programs in Mechanical, Automobile, Electrical, Civil, Chemical, Information and communication technology, and computer engineering. It also offers M.Tech and Ph.D. programs in the same streams. It additionally offers M.Tech. in Nuclear Technology. It also offers M.Tech. and Ph.D. programs in Solar Engineering.
 School of Liberal Studies (Established, 2009) offers UG honors degree programs in Humanities, Management, Science, and Commerce viz. Business Administration, Economics, English Literature, International Relations, Public Policy & Administration, Psychology, Mass Communication, Commerce, Chemistry, Mathematics, and Physics. It also offers MA Programs in English Literature, Public Policy & Administration, and International Relations; as well as Ph.D. programs in the same areas.

Rankings

The National Institutional Ranking Framework (NIRF) ranked it 177 among engineering colleges in 2022.

Campus and Infrastructure
The campus is located at 14 km from the Ahmedabad Airport and 21 km from Ahmedabad's Kalupur Railway Station.  It is 3 km off the main road connecting Gandhinagar to Ahmedabad Airport, Ahmedabad. The university is spread across a lush green pollution-free 100 acres campus with very good biodiversity.  The campus is dotted with mango trees, and the campus houses 18 different varieties of birds.

The university started with a single building and then over the years, expanded infrastructure to five large administrative blocks, an auditorium block, hostel blocks, a cafeteria block, sports grounds, and manicured gardens.

The entire area is walled with four access points, is CCTV monitored, and tobacco-free. On-campus facilities (apart from classrooms and offices) include SBI Branch, pharmacy, stationery store, resident daytime doctor, 24x7 doctor-on-call, ambulance, travel desk, and campus store. Gujarat National Law University is situated nearby.

Office of Research and Sponsored Programs 
The Office of Research and Sponsored Programs provides support for the free and responsible conduct of investigative, scholarly and creative activities, including support from the initial stages of proposal development to grants management, publication, and the transfer of technology. It provides internally funded grants, pre-award and post-award support for externally funded grants and offer education and

International Collaborations 
The university pursues active partnerships and collaborates with foreign universities through MOUs (Memorandum of Understanding). Partnership includes Summer student Exchange Program, and Co-operation in academics.  Currently active partnerships include:

Washington & Jefferson College, Memorial University, Edith Cowan University, University of Bahrain, University of Manitoba, University of Wollongong, University of Alberta, University of Tulsa, Oklahoma University, University of Houston, Georgia Institute of Technology, Texas A&M, University of Saskatchewan, University of Regina, Western University, University of Trinidad & Tobago

Sports 

PDEU campus has sporting facilities and boys and girls teams in Basketball, Volleyball, Cricket, Tennis, Football, Kabaddi, Table Tennis, Badminton, Athletics, Taekwondo, Ultimate frisbee, Kho-Kho, Chess and Carrom.

Petrocup is the annual sporting event, an inter-university contest with almost 5000 participants competing for the top position from 100+ campuses in India and abroad. It is one of the biggest sports event in Gujarat that takes during the month of February every year.

References

External links

 Alumni Team | PDPU Alumni
 Official website
 GERMI website

Universities in Gujarat
Educational institutions established in 2007
Gandhinagar district
Energy in Gujarat
Petroleum engineering schools
Memorials to Deendayal Upadhyay
2007 establishments in Gujarat
Institutions of Petroleum in India